The stone labyrinths of Bolshoi Zayatsky Island are a group of 13 or 14 labyrinths on Bolshoy Zayatsky Island, one of the Solovetsky Islands in Arkhangelsk Oblast, Russia. Lacking standard archaeological study, a research group from St. Petersberg theorize that the labyrinths are about 2500 years old, according to their orientation, their supposed ritual use, and changes in the direction of the zenith on the  solstice throughout history. Most researchers doubt that they are that old; the vast majority of labyrinths in this area date at the earliest to the Middle Ages.

Apart from the labyrinths, there are more than 850 heaps of boulders on Bolshoi Zayatsky Island, plus numerous other stone settings such as a stone symbol with radial spokes, possibly representing the sun. All the labyrinths are concentrated in an area of 0.4 km2 on the western part of the island. Another enormous complex of stone settings on Sopka Hill, in the eastern part of the island, does not include any labyrinths.

All in all, there are 35 labyrinths (known as vavilons – "Babylons" – in the local dialect) in the Solovetsky Islands. All have been made of local boulders. Excavations in the stone heaps have yielded parts of bones.

Characteristics

Measuring between 6 and 25.4 metres in diameter, the labyrinths are mostly made of boulders (c.30–40 cm in diameter) set in a row. The rows are twisted in the form of a spiral; often there are two spirals set one into another, which has been likened to "two serpents with their heads in the middle looking at each other". Intermittently along the spiral there are thicker or wider heaps of stones; the ends of the spirals are also wider.

The entrances are generally on the southern sides of the labyrinths, but can also be found in the south-western, eastern or western parts. The labyrinths have five types of settings, but each has only one entrance which also serves as an exit.

Purpose
The function of the stone settings is unclear. One suggestion is that they may have symbolised a border between this world and the underworld and the labyrinth may have been used for specific rituals to help the souls of the dead travel to another world. Another hypothesis is that the settings may have served as a model for complex fishing equipment.

See also
Troy Town

Notes

Further reading
Виноградов Н. Соловецкие лабиринты. Их происхождение и место в ряду однородных доисторических памятников. Материалы СОК. Вып. 4. Соловки, 1927
Куратов А. Древние лабиринты Архангельского Беломорья. Историко-краеведческий сборник. Вологда, С. 63–76. 1973

External links
Wondermondo - Stone labyrinths of Bolshoi Zayatsky Island
Соловки Энциклопедия Solovki Encyclopaedia
Picture gallery

Archaeological sites in Russia
Mazes
Solovetsky Islands